Homeschooling in the United States of America constitutes the education of about 3.4% of U.S. students (approximately 2 million students) as of 2012. The number of homeschoolers in the United States has increased significantly over the past few decades since the end of the 20th century. In the United States, the Supreme Court has ruled that parents have a fundamental right to direct the education of their children. The right to homeschool is not frequently questioned in court, but the amount of state regulation and help that can or should be expected continues to be subject to legal debate.

United States Supreme Court precedent appears to favor educational choice, as long as states set standards.

Prevalence
Originally, homeschooling in the United States was practiced mainly underground or in rural areas. In the 1970s, several books called attention to homeschooling, and more families began to homeschool their children. As of 2012, about 1.8 million students were homeschooled. In 2016, this number rose to 2.3 million.

The United States Department of Education estimates that 1.5 million K–12 students were homeschooled in the United States in 2007 (with a confidence interval of 1.3 million to 1.7 million), constituting nearly three percent of students. The National Home Education Research Institute estimates this number to be 1.92 million. This was up from 13,000 in 1973, 20,000 in the early 1980s, 93,000 in 1983, 275,000 in 1990, 1 million in 1997, 850,000 in 1999, 1.4 million in 2003, and 1.92 million in 2007. In these estimations, students were defined as being homeschooled if their parents reported them as being schooled at home instead of at a public or private school for at least part of their education, and if their part-time enrollment in public or private school did not exceed 35 hours a week, and excluded students who were schooled at home primarily because of a temporary illness. About four out of five homeschoolers were homeschooled only, while about one out of five homeschoolers was also enrolled in public or private school for 25 hours or less per week. In 2007, 16% of homeschooled students attended a public or private school on a part-time basis.

Increasing numbers of homeschoolers partook in private school, public school, and home partnerships. Homeschool families use them to help teach difficult subjects, such as foreign languages and sciences. In addition, many families do partnerships to help their children compete in academics and athletics with non-homeschooled children. Some students take one or two classes at traditional school campuses while others spend several days per week on campuses designed to educate part-time students.

In 2014, the number of homeschoolers surpassed the number of students attending private schools in North Carolina.

In August 2020, Gallup released a poll indicating that 10% of parents planned to homeschool in the coming year, double the previous percentage.

Motivations

Parents give many different reasons for homeschooling their children.  In the 2003 and 2007 NHES, parents were asked whether particular reasons for homeschooling their children applied to them. The three reasons selected by parents of more than two-thirds of students were concern about the school
environment, to provide religious or moral instruction, and dissatisfaction with the academic instruction available at other schools. From 2003 to 2007, the percentage of students whose parents reported homeschooling to provide religious or moral instruction increased from 72 percent to 83 percent. In 2007, the most common reason parents gave as the most important was a desire to provide religious or moral instruction (36 percent of students). Typically the religious belief being represented is evangelical Christian. This reason was followed by a concern about the school environment (such as safety, drugs, or negative peer pressure) (21 percent), dissatisfaction with academic instruction (17 percent), and "other reasons" including family time, finances, travel, and distance (14 percent). Other reasons include more flexibility in educational practices and family core stability for children with learning disabilities or prolonged chronic illnesses, or for children of missionaries, military families, or families who move often, as frequently as every two years.

Some parents want more opportunities for their children to socialize with a wide range of ages, to travel more, to do more field trips, to visit museums, to do outdoor education, to attend concerts, to visit work places, to tour government buildings, to seek mentorships, and to study nature outside. A homeschooling family can typically do more field trips and visit more places than traditional schools.

Although many parents cite wanting to provide religious or moral instruction as one of the primary reasons for homeschooling, research has shown that young adults who were homeschooled are not significantly more likely to be religious than demographically similar peers who went to private or public school. Analysis by Baylor University sociologist Jeremy Uecker of data from the National Study of Youth and Religion revealed that homeschooled young adults were no more religious than other young adults from the same demographic profile who attended public or private school. In addition, results from the Cardus Education Survey in 2011 found that homeschooled young adults attended religious services with roughly the same frequency as their peers who attended a private, Protestant school, although homeschoolers attended church more often than their Catholic school peers. Milton Gaither, a Professor of Education at Messiah College who has extensively studied homeschooling, concludes that, "homeschooling itself will not automatically produce adults who share the conservative political, religious and moral beliefs of their parents."

Legality

History of legal controversy
The legality of homeschooling in the United States has been debated by educators, lawmakers, and parents since the beginnings of compulsory schooling in Massachusetts in 1852.

For decades the source of debate was focused on whether it was legal for parents to withhold their children from school and educate them in a home setting, pitting homeschooling advocates against those in favor of organized public schools.

Since the late 1980s, the focus on the legality of homeschooling in general is no longer in serious debate but legal questions have shifted to whether homeschooling communities can access state school funds, facilities, and resources. There are also legal questions over the degree of control that a state can exercise on homeschooling families regarding areas like curricula and standardized testing.

In 2008, a three-judge panel of the California Court of Appeals ruled unanimously that children must be taught by a credentialed tutor or person with a teaching credential. The court stated that "It is clear that the education of the children at their home, whatever the quality of that education, does not qualify for the private full-time day school or credentialed tutor exemptions from compulsory education in a public full-time day school." The court rejected the parent's reliance on Yoder's holding regarding religious choice. However, in March 2008, the court agreed to rehear the case and vacated its prior decision. In August 2008, the court issued a new decision unanimously reversing its earlier decision and the Court further stated that homeschooling was legal in California.

U.S. Supreme Court precedent
In the United States, homeschooling is lawful in all fifty states. The U.S. Supreme Court has never ruled on homeschooling specifically, but in Wisconsin v. Yoder, 406 U.S. 205 (1972) it supported the rights of Amish parents to keep their children out of public schools for religious reasons. The Court has ruled, however, that parents have a fundamental right to "establish a home and bring up children" along with the right to "worship God according to the dictates of [their] own conscience." This combination of rights is the basis for calling homeschooling a fundamental right under the Supreme Court's concept of liberty protected by the Due Process Clause. Laws that restrict fundamental rights are subject to strict scrutiny, the highest standard, if the law is challenged in the courts.

The final two sentences from the Supreme Court's opinion in Runyon v. McCrary cited Pierce v. Society of Sisters of the Holy Names of Jesus and Mary, 268 U.S. 510 (1925) and the Court holds that a State may set educational standards but may not limit how parents choose to meet those educational standards.

In Runyon v. McCrary the Court analyzed its prior rulings on educational choice:

In Meyer v. Nebraska, 262 U.S. 390, the Court held that the liberty protected by the Due Process Clause of the Fourteenth Amendment includes the right "to acquire useful knowledge, to marry, establish a home and bring up children," id., at 399, and, concomitantly, the right to send one's children to a private school that offers specialized training - in that case, instruction in the German language. In Pierce v. Society of Sisters, 268 U.S. 510, the Court applied "the doctrine of Meyer v. Nebraska," id., at 534, to hold unconstitutional an Oregon law requiring the parent, guardian, or other person having custody of a child between 8 and 16 years of age [427 U.S. 160, 177] to send that child to public school on pain of criminal liability. The Court thought it "entirely plain that the [statute] unreasonably interferes with the liberty of parents and guardians to direct the upbringing and education of children under their control." Id., at 534-535. In Wisconsin v. Yoder, 406 U.S. 205, the Court stressed the limited scope of Pierce, pointing out that it lent "no support to the contention that parents may replace state educational requirements with their own idiosyncratic views of what knowledge a child needs to be a productive and happy member of society" but rather "held simply that while a State may posit [educational] standards, it may not pre-empt the educational process by requiring children to attend public schools." Id., at 239 (WHITE, J., concurring).

In the 1988 case Murphy v. State of Arkansas, the court summarized is legal position:

The Court has repeatedly stressed that while parents have a constitutional right to send their children to private schools and a constitutional right to select private schools that offer specialized instruction, they have no constitutional right to provide their children with private school education unfettered by reasonable government regulation...Indeed, the Court in Pierce expressly acknowledged "the power of the State reasonably to regulate all schools, to inspect, supervise and examine them, their teachers and pupils..."

Additionally, in Meyer v. Nebraska, the U.S. Supreme Court's majority opinion stated that the liberty protected by the Due Process Clause "without doubt...denotes not merely freedom from bodily restraint but also the right of the individual to contract, to engage in any of the common occupations of life, to acquire useful knowledge, to marry, establish a home and bring up children, to worship God according to the dictates of his own conscience, and generally to enjoy those privileges long recognized...as essential to the orderly pursuit of happiness by free men." In Meyer, the Court held that a 1919 Nebraska law prohibiting the teaching of foreign languages to school children before high school unconstitutionally violated the Due Process Clause of the Fourteenth Amendment.

Many other Court rulings have established or supported the right of parents to provide home education.

Only a short time after compulsory attendance laws became common in the United States, Oregon adopted a statute outlawing private schools. The U.S. Supreme Court struck down the state law as unconstitutional in its 1925 ruling in Pierce v. Society of Sisters of the Holy Names of Jesus and Mary, 268 U.S. 510 (1925). The Court held that a state may not prohibit a parent from satisfying a compulsory attendance requirement by sending their children to private school. This case has frequently been cited by other courts in support of the proposition that parents have a right to satisfy compulsory attendance requirements through home instruction. Parents' right to homeschool their children has clearly been established through subsequent court decisions to such an extent that any statute attempting to forbid it entirely would certainly be struck down on constitutional or other grounds.

Every state has some form of a compulsory attendance law that requires children in a certain age range to spend a specific amount of time being educated.

Laws and regulations
Homeschooling laws can be divided into three categories:

 In some states, homeschooling requirements are based on its treatment as a type of private school (e.g. California, Indiana, and Texas). In those states, homeschools are generally required to comply with the same laws that apply to other (usually non-accredited) schools.
 In other states, homeschool requirements are based on the unique wording of the state's compulsory attendance statute without any specific reference to "homeschooling" (New Jersey and Maryland, for example). In those states, the requirements for homeschooling are set by the particular parameters of the compulsory attendance statute.
 In other states (Maine, New Hampshire, and Iowa, for example) homeschool requirements are based on a statute or group of statutes that specifically applies to homeschooling, although statutes often refer to homeschooling using other nomenclature (in Virginia, for example, the statutory nomenclature is "home instruction"; in South Dakota, it is "alternative instruction"; in Iowa, it is "competent private instruction"). In these states, the requirements for homeschooling are set out in the relevant statutes.

While every state has some requirements, there is great diversity in the type, number, and level of burden imposed. No two states treat homeschooling in exactly the same way. Generally, the burden is less in states in category one above. Furthermore, many states offer more than one option for homeschooling with different requirements applying to each option.

State requirements
Most states do not require any notice of intent. A few states require the filing of a notice with local school officials. In conformity with the general trend to ease requirements, only two states, Rhode Island and Massachusetts, still require parents to obtain approval prior to homeschooling. More stringent requirements even include the need to have a credentialed teacher supervise the homeschooled child's education.

Some states require homeschool students to be enrolled in public schools. Some states allow homeschool students to enroll in public schools but do not require them to do so. Some states prohibit homeschool students from enrolling in public schools.

Proponents of heavier requirements argue that they are necessary for the societal goal of an educated public that is prepared to participate in democratic society. No scientific studies, however, indicate that heavier requirements produce better results. In general, standardized test scores in states with high requirements are no better than in states with lower requirements casting doubt on the wisdom of placing high requirements on homeschooling since higher requirements create higher administrative costs.

The 2014 Freedom in the 50 States study by the Mercatus Center ranks the fifty states by their homeschooling laws including: curriculum control, notification requirements, recordkeeping requirements, standardized testing, and  teacher qualifications. The study finds states such as Alaska, Oklahoma, and Kansas as the freest states for homeschooling while ranking Ohio, Maryland, and Massachusetts at the bottom.

Alabama
Alabama Code § 16-1-11.1 states that "the State of Alabama has no compelling interest to burden by license or regulation nonpublic schools, which include private, church, parochial, and religious schools offering educational instruction in grades K-12, as well as home-based schools and home-schooled students."

Homeschoolers in Alabama have the option to use a private or church school or to use a private tutor; however since 2014, parents have been recognized as being able to homeschool on their own, independently from a church or private cover, and without needing to meet the qualifications listed under the private tutor option. While homeschool is currently distinguished from private and religious schools in both § 16-1-11.1 and § 16-1-11.2, the Alabama State Department of Education (ALSDE) has further clarified that a cover school is not required.

As Alabama generally does not regulate homeschool, requirements are few. Children enrolled in an Alabama public school must be formally withdrawn, which can be done at any time. Parents should also notify the local school district of intent to homeschool to confirm that the student is enrolled and that the parent is in compliance with Alabama Code § 16-28-15; however, the ALSDE notes that neither they nor any other agency is authorized to verify that this has been done. Parents are also expected to keep an attendance register, though a parent not using a cover would not need to report this to the ALSDE or any other agency. The ALSDE has stated that any such reporting requirements "tend to lend themselves to a brick and mortar facility rather than a home school environment." If using a church or private school, parents would also need to comply with any policies set for by that school, and private tutors would need to comply with any requirements set forth by state law and the ALSDE.

California
In California homeschoolers must either a) be part of a public homeschooling program through independent study or a charter school, b) use a credentialed tutor or c) enrol their children in a qualified private school. Such private schools may be formed by the parents in their own home, or parents may use a number of private schools that offer some kind of independent study or distance learning options. All persons who operate private schools in California, including parents forming schools just for their own children, must file an annual affidavit with the Department of Education. They must offer certain courses of study (generally similar to the content required in public schools, but requiring less detailed curricula than those that public schools must follow) and must keep attendance records, but are otherwise not subject to any state oversight.

There is no requirement in California that any private school teachers, whether the school is large or small, must have state credentials, although all teachers must be capable of teaching. This principle was recently challenged. A homeschooling family in Southern California had satisfactorily resolved a lower court case concerning parenting issues, but the children's court-appointed attorneys wanted the court of appeals to make a ruling on the topic of homeschooling. On February 28, 2008, the California Court of Appeals issued a ruling that effectively made homeschooling (except for tutoring by certified teachers) illegal in the state of California. Since the lower case was not about homeschooling, the legal representation of the family and its school, Sunland Christian School, requested a rehearing. The court granted the petition for rehearing, and unanimously reversed itself, deciding that non-credentialed parents could homeschool their children under California law.

Ohio
The law in Ohio that excuses students from compulsory attendance is the Ohio Administrative Code, Chapter 3301-34. Under this law, home education is defined as education that is directed by the parent/guardian of the child. The purpose of the law is to ensure that parent rights to homeschool their children are not violated. Before the homeschooling process begins, the parent/guardian must notify the superintendent in his/her child's school district. Some school districts have forms that they use. As long as the following information is provided in a letter or other form of notification, parents do not have to use the school district forms.

Information that must be provided in a form of notification to the superintendent before homeschooling begins includes: the school year, name of parent, and address (telephone is optional), child's birth date, parent signature guaranteeing that the subjects listed in the Ohio Administrative Code are part of homeschooling, outline of the curriculum that the parent plans to cover in the next year, a list of materials that the parent plans to use, parent signature guaranteeing that the child will be in home education for 900 hours during the upcoming school year, and finally assurance that the home instructor has a high school diploma or the equivalence of a high school diploma. Parents must also send an academic assessment to the superintendent from the previous school year. The academic assessment report needs to be one of two things: either the results of a nationally normed, standardized test or a written portfolio. The portfolio should include samples of the student's work. The superintendent must notify the parents within fourteen days of his/her decision.

Texas
Before 1985, the legality of homeschooling was undefined in Texas State law.  As such, homeschooling parents interpreted the lack of prohibition as giving them the right to homeschool, while school districts interpreted it as prohibitive. The requirements were clarified in the landmark case "Leeper vs. Arlington Independent School District (AISD)", which put in place clear standards and guidelines for defining a homeschool and removed any doubt about the legality of homeschooling in the State.

The Texas Education Agency (TEA) has no authority to regulate homeschools. TEA considers homeschools to be equivalent to unaccredited private schools; TEA states that private schools are not required to be accredited, and it has no authority to regulate those, either. The only requirements within state law are:

State law requires that a school, regardless of type 1) must teach reading, spelling, grammar, mathematics and "good citizenship" (typically civics). 2) The curriculum must be in visual form 3) must be taught in a bona fide manner (which means there must be a real intent to actually provide education). The curriculum may be of any type of media provided it is in visual form (e.g., textbooks, workbooks, and computer-based including via the Internet), can be obtained from any source desired, and does not have to be provided or approved by the state or the local school district prior to use.
State law does not specify any minimum number of days in a year, or hours in a day, that must be met for non-public schools. Nor does it mandate a specific time of the day during which classes must be held, thus potentially removing penalization for violating compulsory attendance laws that cover public schoolers.
State law does not require standardized testing for other than public school students.
State law does not restrict homeschool families from combining into one group setting for educational purposes.  (However, homeschool advocates such as Texas Home School Coalition (THSC) caution that whenever more than three children outside the family are involved, problems could arise with local zoning ordinances, and a state license for child care may be required.)
State law does not require registration or annual filings for non-public schools.
State law does not require any teacher credentials, or proven capability for non-public schools (though private schools are permitted to require such as a condition of employment); the lack of required credentials or proven capability is intended to allow parents to teach their own children.
State law requires notification only if the child was previously in a public school and is withdrawn; the notification required is merely a letter notifying the school district of the parent(s)' intent, and only one letter is required at the initial decision to withdraw the child from public school and homeschool instead (annual letters are not required). Parents who homeschool from day one, and never enroll their children at a public school, are not required to give any notice.

Homeschool students may enroll in public schools, but they are not required to do so.

Virginia
To teach children at home, the teaching parent must meet at least one of the following criteria:
 Possess a valid high school diploma (or a higher degree, such as can be obtained through a university), which must be submitted to the district's superintendent—a GED does not fulfill this requirement
 Hold a valid teacher's certificate as approved by the state
 Provide a distance or correspondence curriculum approved by the Superintendent of Public Instruction
 Provide evidence that they, as the teaching parent, can meet the Virginia Standards of Learning objectives

The teaching parent must annually inform the district of their intent to instruct children at home. The children must have all state-mandated vaccinations required of students in public education, with the exception of those who have a religious objection to vaccinations and have completed a notarized Certificate of Religious Exemption Form CRE 1. (This is a different from the religious exemption from public school attendance that is guaranteed by law in Virginia Code §22.1-254 when the tenets of that family's faith prohibits them from attending school). Part-time enrollment in public school is rare, but allows for home-instructed students to take some classes (often higher level math and science or electives like foreign language that parents don't feel confident teaching). A homeschooled student may or may not be eligible to play sports for the school in their area, depending on the school.

Other options not governed by the above include home instruction by a certified tutor with a valid Virginia Board of Education teaching license and religious exemptions. The latter, unique to Virginia, is due to a family's irreconcilable religious difference with a public education. This often relates to science and social studies, which may teach information contrary to the beliefs of a particular family. If parents present sufficient evidence that a child's family has religious backing that attending school is abhorrent to their faith, and fill out the proper forms, none of the above is required to instruct a child at home.

At the end of each year, the district must be provided with written documentation that the student has made academic progress. This could be through a letter from an educator holding a master's degree or higher in education who has evaluated the achievement of the student through the submission of a portfolio or through a report card or transcript from an accredited program (i.e., a community college or correspondence program employed as the primary curriculum). If these are not available, the use of some form of "nationally normed standardized achievement test" is required. The scores attained must be at or above the twenty-third percentile. Some tests that may be used include the "Stanford Achievement Test, the Comprehensive Test of Basic Skills (CTBS), the California Achievement Tests (CAT), the Iowa Test of Basic Skills (ITBS-TAP), Science Research Associates (SRA), or the Woodcock-Johnson Educational Battery."

Because homeschoolers do not receive a diploma from the state of Virginia, one of the major struggles faced is entering community college or higher education. Those who do correspondence curricula get diplomas from the program, while others get GEDs. Children who receive home instruction are not required to take the SOL examinations, which may contribute to the inability to obtain a diploma accredited by the state. However, this does not stop many homeschooled students in Virginia from going to college and studying a wide variety of subjects.  It just means that there is a lot of consideration given to scores on achievement tests like the SATs and the Advanced Placement exams.

Washington

Under Washington state law RCW 28A.225.010, education is compulsory for children eight or older or if the child has been officially enrolled in public school. Washington does require (RCW 28A.225.010) that homeschools teach reading, writing, spelling, language, math, science, social studies, history, health, occupational education, art and music appreciation. However, the subjects do not have to be taught separately, and the state does not require a timeline or schedule to be submitted or adhered to, other than to meet the requirements of a yearly evaluation. Each year the student must be evaluated according to law RCW28A.200.010, in the form of:

A standardized achievement test that has been approved by the State Board of Education
OR a non-test assessment administered by a Washington State certified teacher who must be currently working in the field of education.

The tests are confidential and only the parent receives a copy. The Washington Homeschooling Organization (WHO) keeps a list of the individuals who may administer the tests, or non-test evaluation.

Both the tests and results are required to be kept per RCW 28A.200.010 but does not specify in what form they be kept (Original or photocopy), they are not required by any state agency and parents do not have to share them. However, the records can, and probably will be requested by a school administration if the parents later decide to enroll their children in formal schooling. The state requires immunization records in accordance with law, and requests that further records be kept on instructional and educational activities.

To start homeschooling parents must annually file a Declaration of Intent to Provide Home Based Instruction RCW 28A.200.010 and be state qualified to homeschool (RCW 28A.225.010).

Testing and assessment

States also differ in their requirements regarding testing and assessment. Following the general trend toward easing requirements, fewer than half the states now require any testing or assessment. In some states, homeschoolers are required either to submit the results of a standardized test (sometimes from an established list of tests) or to have a narrative evaluation done by a qualified teacher. Other states give parents wide latitude in the type of assessment to be submitted.

Again, using California as an example, students enrolled in a public program are encouraged to take the same year-end standardized tests that all public school students take, but students using tutors or enrolled in any private school, homeschool or not, are not required to take any tests. Texas also does not require standardized tests for any student outside the public school arena, and absence of such tests cannot be used to discriminate against enrollment in higher education.

Recognition of completion

There are also differences between the states in graduating children from homeschools. In states where homeschools must be, or can be operated as any other private school, graduation requirements for all private schools in that state generally also apply to the homeschools. Some state education laws have no graduation requirements for private schools, leaving it up to the private schools to determine which students meet graduation requirements, and thus allow homeschoolers the same privilege. (For example, as stated above, Texas considers the successful completion of a homeschool education equivalent to graduation from a public or private school.)

Homeschooling is increasingly becoming recognized as a viable alternative to institutional education, and fewer families are targeted for prosecution. In an unintended demonstration of the increasing acceptance of homeschooling, the outgoing Superintendent of Public Instruction for the state of California, Delaine Eastin, caused a furor by telling the state legislature that homeschooling was illegal and that families could not form private schools themselves or teach their children without credentials. She called for a legislative "solution" to the growing "problem" of homeschooling. The legislature balked at taking any action. Then, Ms. Eastin's successor, Jack O'Connell, instructed his legal staff to review the state laws.

Homeschooling advocates were informed by one of the Department of Education attorneys that the state was reversing the position it had taken under Ms. Eastin's tenure. Statements that parents could not teach their own children or form their own private schools were removed from the state Department of Education website. Although some officials still maintain traditional views, truancy prosecutions in California are much rarer now than they were under Ms. Eastin's leadership. Those prosecutions that are still pursued routinely fail, and district attorneys now usually refuse to file such cases.

Curricula
Curriculum requirements vary from state to state. Some states require homeschoolers to submit information about their curriculum or lesson plans. Other states (such as Texas) just require that certain subjects be covered and do not require submission of the curriculum. Still others, such as North Carolina, view homeschools as a type of private school, affording each homeschool the freedom to choose the curriculum appropriate for its students.  While many complete curricula are available from a wide variety of secular and religious sources, many families choose to use a variety of resources to cover the required subjects. In fact, it is not uncommon for a homeschooled student to earn a number of college credits from a 2- or 4-year college before completing the 12th grade.

Some states offer public-school-at-home programs. These online or virtual, public schools (usually charter schools) mimic major aspects of the homeschooling paradigm, for example, instruction occurs outside of a traditional classroom, usually in the home. However, students in such programs are truly public school students and are subject to all or most of the requirements of other public school students. When parents enroll their children in such a program, they effectively surrender control over the curriculum and program to the public school, although a casual observer might think they are homeschooling.

Some public-school-at-home programs give parents leeway in curriculum choice; others require use of a specified curriculum. Full parental or student control over the curriculum and program, however, is a hallmark feature of homeschooling. Taxpayers pay the cost of providing books, supplies, and other needs, for public-school-at-home students, just as they do for conventional public school students. The U.S. Constitution's prohibition against establishing religion applies to public-school-at-home programs, so taxpayer money cannot lawfully be used to purchase a curriculum that is religious in nature.

Access to resources
A minority of states have statutes that require public schools to give homeschooled students access to district resources, such as school libraries, computer labs, extracurricular activities, or even academic courses. In some communities, homeschoolers meet with a teacher periodically for curriculum review and suggestions. The laws of some states give districts the option of giving homeschooled students access to such resources.

Public libraries will also foster homeschooling. Librarians are able to aid in the procurement of resources needed for homeschooling such as internet access, database access, and interlibrary loan material. Striking up a conversation with a librarian might lead to new knowledge about available resources, as librarians work with homeschooled patrons often.

Access to interscholastic athletic competition varies from state to state.

 Some state athletic associations, such as the Kentucky High School Athletic Association, completely ban homeschoolers from interscholastic competition; both by prohibiting homeschoolers to compete for a state federation member school as well as by prohibiting member schools to compete against independent teams made up of homeschoolers. In such states, homeschoolers may only compete amongst other homeschoolers or against schools that are not members of the state's interscholastic athletic federation.
 Other states allow homeschoolers to compete for the public schools that they would otherwise attend by virtue of their residence; for example, former NFL quarterback and current ESPN analyst Tim Tebow was able to play high school football because under Florida law, a public school must allow homeschoolers resident in its attendance area unimpeded access to extracurricular activities, including varsity athletics. Tebow's success has inspired similar legislation to be introduced in other states, including Texas.
 Still other state interscholastic athletic associations allow homeschoolers to organize teams that compete against other established schools, but do not allow homeschoolers to compete on established school teams. The Texas Association of Private and Parochial Schools, the largest of several governing bodies for non-public schools in Texas, uses this option, as does the Michigan High School Athletic Association, though the MHSAA allows such contests during regular season play only.

Homeschooling and college admissions
Many students choose to pursue higher education at the college or university level, some through dual enrollment while in high school and through standardized tests such as the College Level Examination Program (CLEP) and DANTES Subject Standard Tests (DSST).

The College Board recommends that homeschooled students keep detailed records and portfolios to aid them in the admission process.

Over the last several decades, US colleges and universities have become increasingly open to accepting homeschooled students. 75% of colleges and universities have an official policy for homeschool admissions and 95% have received applications from homeschoolers for admission.  Documents that may be required for admission vary, but may include ACT/SAT scores, essays, high school transcript, letters of recommendation, SAT 2 scores, personal interviews, portfolio, and a GED.  78% of admissions officers expect homeschooled students to do as well or better than traditional high school graduates at college.  Students coming from a homeschool graduated from college at a higher rate than their peers¬—66.7 percent compared to 57.5 percent—and earned higher grade point averages along the way.

Such students have matriculated at over 900 different colleges and universities, including institutions with highly selective standards of admission such as the US military academies, Rice University, Haverford College, Harvard University, Stanford University, Cornell University, Northwestern University, Brown University, Dartmouth College, and Princeton University.

Homeschool athletics
In 1994, retired NFL defensive end Jason Taylor, then a homeschool football player in Pennsylvania, engaged in a legal battle against the National Collegiate Athletic Association (NCAA, the leading oversight association governing U.S. collegiate athletics) and its classification of homeschool athletes as essentially high school dropouts. Taylor's legal victory has provided a precedent for thousands of other homeschool athletes to compete in colleges and attain the same opportunities in education and professional development that other athletes enjoy. Other homeschool students who have risen to the top of collegiate competition include NCAA 2005 champion tennis player Chris Lam, Kevin Johnson of the University of Tulsa basketball team, 2010-2011 Big South Player of the Year Jesse Sanders of the Liberty University Flames, and the 2007 Heisman Trophy winner Tim Tebow from the University of Florida. In 2012, another homeschool student was a Heisman Trophy finalist: Collin Klein of Kansas State University.

In Texas, Six-Man Football has also been popular among homeschoolers, with at least five teams being fielded for the 2008-2009 season. The top three places in the Texas Independent State Championship (also called "the Ironman Bowl") were claimed by homeschool teams.

Advocacy organizations
There are several national homeschooling advocacy groups, such as:

 Home School Legal Defense Association (HSLDA) 
 Alliance for Intellectual Freedom in Education
 Center for Homeschool Liberty
 American Homeschool Association
 National Home Education Network
 Association of HomeSchool Attorneys
 National Home Education Legal Defence
 National Alliance of Secular Homeschoolers
 Texas Home School Coalition

Homeschooling conventions
There are many homeschooling conventions and conferences featuring exhibitors and workshops. There are two main types of homeschooling conventions: public and organization (Christian, secular, Catholic). Some larger shows in the United States include, but are not limited to the following:

 Alabama Homeschool Expo (Montgomery, AL)
 CHEA Convention (Pasadena, CA)
 FPEA Convention (Orlando, Florida)
 Great Homeschool Conventions (GHC)
 HEAV State Convention & Educational Fair (Richmond, Virginia)
 HSC Conference (San Francisco Bay Area, California)
 Southeast Homeschool Expo (Atlanta, Georgia)
 ICHE Convention (usually in Naperville, Illinois, a Chicago suburb)
 Texas Home School Coalition Conventions (Arlington and The Woodlands, TX)
 Washington Homeschool Organization Conference (Tacoma, WA)

The Constitution does not protect homeschooling in explicit terms. But a sound reading of Meyer and Pierce, the Supreme Court precedents that protect parents' rights to choose private over public schools, implies such a right.

References

 
United States